Kenneth Cranham (born 12 December 1944) is a Scottish film, television, radio and stage actor.

Early life
Cranham was born in Dunfermline, Fife, the son of Lochgelly-born Margaret McKay Cranham (née Ferguson) and Ronald Cranham, a London-born civil servant.

Career
Cranham trained at the National Youth Theatre of Great Britain, and at RADA. He starred in the title role in the popular 1980s comedy drama Shine on Harvey Moon, prior to which he had appeared as Charlie Collins in A Family at War (1971). He also appeared in Layer Cake, Gangster No. 1, Rome, Oliver! and many other films. Cranham was cast as the deranged Philip Channard and his Cenobitic alter-ego in the Horror film Hellbound: Hellraiser II. Among many stage credits are West End productions of Entertaining Mr Sloane, Loot, An Inspector Calls (both transferring to Broadway), The Ruffian on the Stair, The Birthday Party and Gaslight (at the Old Vic). For his role as Inspector Goole in An Inspector Calls, he was nominated for a Laurence Olivier Award.

In 2016, Cranham won the Olivier Award for Best Actor in a Play for his role as Andre in Florian Zeller's The Father. The play originated at the Theatre Royal Bath's Ustinov Studio in the autumn of 2014, before touring the country and transferring to the West End in the summer of 2015, returning to the Duke of York's Theatre in spring 2016. The play received an unprecedented five star review from every leading national press publication. Cranham's performance was described as "the performance of his life".

For BBC Radio 4's Afternoon Play, Cranham has played DS Max Matthews in The Interrogation by Roy Williams (2012–present) and starred as Thomas Gradgrind in BBC Radio's 2007 adaptation of Dickens' Hard Times.

Personal life
His first wife was actress Diana Quick. He has two daughters: Nancy Cranham from a relationship with actress Charlotte Cornwell, and Kathleen Cranham with his second wife, to whom he is still married, actress Fiona Victory.

Filmography

Film

Oliver! (1968) as Noah Claypole
Otley (1968) as Kid #3
Fragment of Fear (1970) as Joe
All the Way Up (1970) as Tom Midway
Up Pompeii (1971) as First Christian
Brother Sun, Sister Moon (1972) as Paolo
Vampira (1974) as Paddy, the Delinquent
Robin and Marian (1976) as Jack's Apprentice
Peer Gynt (1976)
Joseph Andrews (1977) as The Wicked Squire
Chocolat (1988) as Boothby
Stealing Heaven (1988) as Suger
Hellbound: Hellraiser II (1988) as Dr. Philip Channard / Channard Cenobite
   Frederick Forsyth Presents: Just Another Secret (1989) as Brosch
A Little Bit Of Lippy (1989) as Reggie Titherington
Prospero's Books (1991) as Sebastian
Under Suspicion (1991) as Frank
Tale of a Vampire (1992) as Edgar
Bed of Roses (1996) as Simon
Deep in the Heart (1996) as Robert Flaherty
The Boxer (1997) as Matt MaGuire
RPM (1998) as Biggerman
Vigo (1998) as The Producer
Women Talking Dirty (1999) as George
The Last Yellow (1999) as Len
Kevin & Perry Go Large (2000) as Vicar
Gangster No. 1 (2000) as Tommy
Born Romantic (2000) as Barney
The Most Fertile Man in Ireland (2000) as Da
Shiner (2000) as Gibson
Two Men Went to War (2002) as Sgt. Peter King
Man Dancin' (2003) as D.I. Pancho Villers
Blackball (2003) as Chairman Collins
Trauma (2004) as Detective Constable Jackson 
Layer Cake (2004) as Jimmy Price
Mangal Pandey: The Rising (2005) as Kent
A Good Year (2006) as Sir Nigel
Hot Fuzz (2007) as James Reaper
Valkyrie (2008) as Field Marshal Wilhelm Keitel
Running in Traffic (2009) as Bill Cullen
Made in Dagenham (2010) as Monty Taylor
5 Days of War (2011) as Michael Stilton 
National Theatre Live: The Cherry Orchard (2011) as Firs
Flying Blind (2012) as Victor
Suspension of Disbelief (2012) as Bullock
Closed Circuit (2013) as Cameron Fischer
The Legend of Hercules (2014) as Lucius
Maleficent (2014) as King Henry
Film Stars Don't Die in Liverpool (2017) as Joe Turner
Mr. Jones (2019) as David Lloyd George
Official Secrets (2019) as Judge Hyam

Television

 City '68 (1967) as Len
 Ways with Words (1967) 
 Boy Meets Girl (1969) as Tom Last
 Z-Cars (1970) as Togo Millington
 Softly, Softly: Taskforce (1970–1972) as Ken Buckley / Ashley
 A Family at War (1971) as Charlie Collins
 Hadleigh (1971) as Andrew Matlock
 From a Bird's Eye View (1971) as Tim O'Donovan
 New Scotland Yard (1972) as David Collins
 Budgie (1972) as Inky Ballantine
 Achilles Heel (1973) as Gordon
 Crown Court (1973–1981) as John Tucker / Clive Jessup QC
 Village Hall (1975) as Lop
 Against the Crowd (1975) as Geoff Smailes
 Holding On (1977) as Ted Wheelwright
 The Velvet Glove (1977) as Townie
 Danger UXB (1979) as Sapper Salt / L / Corporal Salt
 Donkeys' Years (1980) as Bill Taylor
 Thérèse Raquin (1980) as Camille Raquin
 Enemy at the Door (1980) as Jack Foster
 Cribb (1980) as Francis Mostyn-Smith
 'Tis Pity She's a Whore (1980) as Giovanni
 The Merchant of Venice (1980) as Gratiano
 Strangers (1980–1982) as Det. Chief Insp. Jim Lennard / Willie Bruce
 Brideshead Revisited (1981) as Sergeant Block
 The Bell (1982) as Nick Fawley
 Shine on Harvey Moon (1982–1985) as Harvey Moon
 Reilly: Ace of Spies (1983) as Lenin
 Heart of the High Country (1985) as Calvin Laird
 Dead Man's Folly (1986) as Detective Inspector Bland
 A Sort of Innocence (1987) as Eric Palmer
 Inspector Morse (1987) as Cedric Downes
 The Play on One: Normal Service (1988) as Peter
 Just Another Secret (1989) as Brosch
 Boon (1989) as Aiden Curtis
 Oranges Are Not the Only Fruit (1990) as Pastor Finch
 TECX (1990) as Colonel Braum
 Casualty (1990) as James Lawrence
 Dunrulin (1990) as Mr. Kneecap
 El C.I.D. (1990–1992) as Gus Mercer
 Chimera (1991) as Hennessey
 Bergerac (1990) as Gascoigne
 Van der Valk (1991) as Dirk Boutsen
 Murder Most Horrid (1991) as Inspector Salford
 The Young Indiana Jones Chronicles (1992) as Colonel Schmidt
 Between the Lines (1992) as D.C.I. Stubbs
 Minder (1993) as Walter
 Screen One (1993) as Douglas
 Lovejoy (1993) as Litvak
 Requiem Apache (1994) as Tony
 On Dangerous Ground (1996) as Brig. Charles Ferguson
 Heartbeat (1996) as Charlie Wallace
 The Tenant of Wildfell Hall (1996) as Reverend Millward
 Midnight Man (1997) as Brig. Charles Ferguson
 Get Well Soon (1997) as Inspector Trussler
 Our Mutual Friend (1998) as Silas Wegg
 Kavanagh QC (1998) as Roy Lawrence
 The Murder of Stephen Lawrence (1999) as Michael Mansfield QC
 Justice in Wonderland (2000) as George Carman
 Lady Audley's Secret (2000) as Sir Michael Audley
 The Ancients (2000) as William Blake
 The Sins (2000) as Gilbert
 Without Motive (2000) as DCS Derek Henderson
 NCS: Manhunt (2001) as Ricky Valesi
 Dalziel and Pascoe (2001) as Tommy Collingwood
 Night Flight (2002) as Ted Atwell
 Dickens (2002) as John Forster
 Believe Nothing (2002) as DI Aldiss
 Pollyanna (2003) as Mr. Pendleton
 Killing Hitler (2003) as Brigadier Sir Stewart Menzies
 Sparkling Cyanide (2003) as George Barton
 Bible Mysteries (2003)
 M.I.T.: Murder Investigation Team (2005) as Ray Morgan
 Genghis Khan (2005) as Genghis Khan (voice)
 Rome (2005) as Pompey Magnus
 The Lavender List (2006) as Harold Wilson
 The Chatterley Affair (2006) as Older Keith
 Hustle (2006) as Francis Owen
 Hannibal (2006) as Narrator (voice)
 New Tricks (2006) as Lord McCready
 The Line of Beauty (2006) as Sir Maurice Tipper
 Afterlife (2006) as Stan Mundy
 Victoria Cross Heroes (2006) as Narrator
 Doc Martin (2006, 2022) as Terry Glasson
 Lilies (2007) as Mr. Pritchard
 Sinking of the Lusitania: Terror at Sea (2007) as Captain Turner
 The Last Detective (2007) as Gary Solway
 The Curry Club (2007) as Bob
 Heroes and Villains (2007) as General Carteaux
 Tess of the D'Urbervilles (2008) as Mr Clare
 Merlin (2008) as Aulfric
 Agatha Christie's Marple (2008) as Rex Fortescue
 Spanish Flu: The Forgotten Fallen (2009) as MJ O'Loughlin
 Midsomer Murders (2010) as Jude Langham
 The Night Watch (2011) as Horace Mundy
 Upstairs Downstairs (2012) as Sergeant Ashworth
 Falcón (2012) as Alberto Montes
 Panto! (2012) as Jerry
 Death in Paradise (2013) as Father John
 In the Flesh (2013–2014) as Vicar Oddie
 37 Days (2014) as John Burns
 Moving On (2014) as Mike
 A.D. The Bible Continues (2015) as Tiberius
 Neil Gaiman's Likely Stories (2016) as Dean Smith
 War & Peace (2016) as Uncle Mikhail
 The White Princess (2017) as John Morton
 Bancroft (2017) as Charlie Baverstock
 Hatton Garden (2019) as Brian Reader
 Finding Alice (2021) as Gerry Walsh

Radio

Grossman's War: Stalingrad (2019) as Stepan Spiridonov
The Father (2016) as Andre
The Interrogation (2012–present) as DS/DI Max Matthews
The Moonstone (2011) as Sergeant Cuff
The Hireling (2011) as the Narrator
Grossman's War: Life and Fate (2011) as Stepan Spiridonov
My Mad Grandad (2009) as Bernard Hill
Tinker Tailor Soldier Spy (2009) as Inspector Mendel
Call for the Dead (2009) as Inspector Mendel
Left in Trust (2009)
Hard Times (2007) as Thomas Gradgrind
Answered Prayers (2004) as Walter
The Winter's Tale (2004) as Polixenes
The Chief Inspector Dover Mysteries (2003) as Chief Inspector Dover
His Dark Materials: Northern Lights (2003) as Farder Coram
Barry Lyndon (2003) as The Earl of Crabs
Hopes and Desires: "The Non-Entity" (2003) as Dmitri
Carmilla (2003) as Mountebank/General
New Grub Street (2002) as Mr. Yule
Little Dorrit (2001) as Mr. Merdle
Hamlet (1999) as Claudius
In the Chair (1998) as Jim Hardie
The Barchester Chronicles (1997) as Crawley
The Tin Drum (1996) as Matzerath
Brighton Rock (1996) as Cubitt
Cyrano de Bergerac (1996) as De Guiche
Talking (1995) as The Judge
It's Cold Outside (1995) as Ray
Beau Geste (1994) as Sgt. Major LeJaune
Only The Good Die Young (1992) as Stone
Georgy Girl (1992) as James
The Admirable Crichton (1986) as Crichton
The White Devil (1983) as Duke Francisco
Fear and Fear Again (1983) as Franz Kafka
Busman's Honeymoon (1983) as Frank Crutchley
The Dog It Was That Died (1982) as Hogben
Loot as Hal
Men of Violence (1979) as Blaze
The Ruffian on the Stair (1964) as Wilson
Boy Dudgeon (1963) as Boy Dudgeon

He has also performed a number of readings for BBC Radio.

Awards and nominations

Theatre

References

External links

Kenneth Cranham HBO Bio
 Kenneth Cranham on BBC Genome

1944 births
Alumni of RADA
National Youth Theatre members
Living people
People from Dunfermline
Scottish male film actors
Scottish male television actors
Scottish male radio actors
Scottish people of English descent
20th-century Scottish male actors
21st-century Scottish male actors